Klejdi Hyka (born 13 June 1997) is an Albanian professional footballer who most recently played for Korabi Peshkopi in the Albanian First Division.

References

1997 births
Living people
Footballers from Durrës
Albanian footballers
Association football forwards
KF Teuta Durrës players
Besa Kavajë players
KF Korabi Peshkopi players
Kategoria Superiore players
Kategoria e Parë players